Adanak (Adanaq) is a rural locality (a selo) in Karabudakhkentsky District, Republic of Dagestan, Russia. The population was 1,464 as of 2010. There are 11 streets.

Geography 
Adanak is located 14 km northwest of Karabudakhkent (the district's administrative centre) by road. Geli and Paraul are the nearest rural localities.

Nationalities 
Kumyks live there.

References 

Rural localities in Karabudakhkentsky District